Wazed Ali Biswas (-24 December 2003) was a Bangladesh Nationalist Party politician and a businessman from the southern part of Bangladesh. He was elected a member of parliament from Satkhira-4 in February 1996.

Early life 
Wazed Ali biswas was born in 1947 in Kaliganz Upazila, Satkhira District. He was the third son of the famous landlord and one of the founding fathers of shrimp cultivation in Bangladesh, Garibullah Biswas.

Career 
Biswas was the owner of Khulna-based daily Janata Khabar and president of the BNP's Kaliganj upazila branch. He was elected to parliament from Satkhira-4 as a Bangladesh Nationalist Party candidate in 15 February 1996 Bangladeshi general election.

Wazed Ali, a frozen shrimp exporter, was awarded the National Export Trophy (Gold Medal) on 16 December 2003 by the then Prime Minister Khaleda Zia. He also received the President's Medal for his contribution to agriculture, education and social service in Satkhira district.

The Chairman of Delta Fish Limited also owned the famous ‘ঠিকানা’ residence located in the heart of Khulna City.

Family 
Wazed Ali Biswas left behind 3 sons and 1 daughter. His Eldest Son, Saiful Islam Dual took over his business empire after his demise. He walked on the path of his father and continued to serve the people of Khulna, Satkhira and Paikgacha.

Saiful Islam Dual also received the Prime Minister’s Award (Gold Medal) for exports twice. He is a shrimp exporter and has been successfully contributing to the shrimp sector of Bangladesh for nearly two decades. At the age of 27, he became a CIP title holder. He is the Managing Director of 4 Star Group Limited who are also involved in Real Estate.

References 

1947 births
2003 deaths
People from Satkhira District
Bangladesh Nationalist Party politicians
6th Jatiya Sangsad members